Raoul de Warren (born 5 September 1905 in Lyon - d. 5 March 1992 in Paris) was a writer, historian, genealogist and lawyer.
He was the President of the Evidence Commission for the Association d'entraide de la noblesse française (Mutual Aid Association of the French nobility).

Family

Raoul de Warren's father, William de Warren, was a descendant of a Jacobite family that moved to Nancy in 1692, after the deposition of king James II of England.
His mother, Marie Seguin, was the granddaughter of Marc Seguin, a member of the Institut de France, builder of the first steamship in France, inventor of boilers, railroads and suspension bridges.
Raoul de Warren married Marie de Montrichard.

Career

Raoul de Warren obtained a Bachelor of Arts degree in history and geography, and became a Doctor of Law, specializing in agricultural issues.
His honors thesis, Ireland and its political institutions (1928) won an award from the Institut de France.
However, the Irish minister in Paris did not consider the thesis of any great value.
His first work of fiction was  a short psychological drama published in 1926, while he was studying at Nancy. In 1934 he published a new novel entitled Un jour comme tous les autres (A day like any other) developing the theme of premonition.

Raoul de Warren has been recognized as a leading authority on the French nobility.
He became Secretary General of the Federation of French Heraldry and Genealogy.
The Genealogy Society of Loir-et-Cher was created in 1966 by Raoul de Warren and Michael de Sachy. It is the oldest genealogical society in France, after Paris.

Reception

The Romanian poet and novelist Jean Parvulesco has described de Warren's works of fiction as inspiring and "mediumistic".
A review of his novel L'insolite aventure de Marina Sloty, which involves time travel and romance, describes the novel as "a true success" and "excellent".

Bibliography

Historical works

With Aymon de Lestrange

Fiction

Other
Social insurance and the allowance for elderly employed in agriculture, the agricultural social Publications, 1943.

References

1905 births
1992 deaths
Heraldists